The football tournament at the 1983 Spartakiad of Peoples of the USSR was a preparatory competition for the Soviet Union Olympic football team among the Olympic reserves and the third football tournament at the Spartakiad of Peoples of the USSR. The competition took place on July 16 through August 3, 1983 as part of the Spartakiad of Peoples of the USSR. The football team of Moscow were the two-times defending champions.

The competition included footballers under 20 years of age (U-20, born between 1963 and 1965). All participating teams at first were split in four groups with top two team in each of them advancing to the next round forming two semifinal groups of four in each. Depending on their standing in their groups, teams would play off with another team that placed the same place in another group.

Competition

Preliminary games
All times local (UTC+3)

Group 1 (Moscow)

{| class=wikitable style="text-align:center"
|-
!width="165"|Team
!width="20"|
!width="20"|
!width="20"|
!width="20"|
!width="20"|
!width="20"|
!width="20"|
!width="20"|
|- style="background:#cfc"
|align=left| Moscow
|3||2||1||0||6||0||+6||5
|- style="background:#cfc"
|align=left| RSFSR
|3||1||2||0||3||0||+3||4
|- style="background:#ccf"
|align=left| Kazakhstan
|3||1||1||1||6||2||+4||3
|- style="background:#fcc"
|align=left| Kyrgyzia
|3||0||0||3||1||14||-13||0
|}

Group 2 (Ryazan)
{| class=wikitable style="text-align:center"
|-
!width="165"|Team
!width="20"|
!width="20"|
!width="20"|
!width="20"|
!width="20"|
!width="20"|
!width="20"|
!width="20"|
|- style="background:#cfc"
|align=left| Ukraine
|3||3||0||0||11||1||+10||6
|- style="background:#cfc"
|align=left| Armenia
|3||2||0||1||3||5||-2||4
|- style="background:#ccf"
|align=left| Uzbekistan
|3||1||0||2||3||6||-3||2
|- style="background:#fcc"
|align=left| Azerbaijan
|3||0||0||3||0||5||-5||0
|}

Group 3 (Tula)
{| class=wikitable style="text-align:center"
|-
!width="165"|Team
!width="20"|
!width="20"|
!width="20"|
!width="20"|
!width="20"|
!width="20"|
!width="20"|
!width="20"|
|- style="background:#cfc"
|align=left| Lithuania
|4||2||1||1||8||3||+5||5
|- style="background:#cfc"
|align=left| Belorussia
|4||2||1||1||6||5||+1||5
|- style="background:#ccf"
|align=left| Turkmenia
|4||2||0||2||4||6||−2||4
|- style="background:#fcc"
|align=left| Estonia
|4||2||0||2||7||6||+1||4
|- style="background:#fcc"
|align=left| Latvia
|4||1||0||3||3||8||-5||2
|}

Lithuania finished first ahead of Belorussia based on their goal difference.
Turkmenia finished third ahead of Estonia based on their head-to-head match up.

 Right after the game Anatoliy Komarov (Turkmen SSR) and Valeriy Loginov (Belarusian SSR) grabbed each other's jersey and shoved one another. On the way to locker rooms Anatoliy Komarov (Turkmen SSR) hit Igor Omelchenko (Turkmen SSR).

Group 4 (Ivanovo)
{| class=wikitable style="text-align:center"
|-
!width="165"|Team
!width="20"|
!width="20"|
!width="20"|
!width="20"|
!width="20"|
!width="20"|
!width="20"|
!width="20"|
|- style="background:#cfc"
|align=left| Moldavia
|3||2||1||0||5||3||+2||4
|- style="background:#cfc"
|align=left| Georgia
|3||2||0||1||4||3||+1||3
|- style="background:#ccf"
|align=left| Leningrad
|3||1||1||1||2||2||0||3
|- style="background:#fcc"
|align=left| Tajikistan
|3||0||0||3||2||5||-3||2
|}

Semifinals groups
Group A (Moscow)
{| class=wikitable style="text-align:center"
|-
!width="165"|Team
!width="20"|
!width="20"|
!width="20"|
!width="20"|
!width="20"|
!width="20"|
!width="20"|
!width="20"|
|- style="background:#cfc"
|align=left| Lithuania
|3||2||1||0||5||2||+3||5
|- 
|align=left| Moscow
|3||1||2||0||8||5||+3||4
|- 
|align=left| Georgia
|3||0||2||1||5||6||-1||2
|- 
|align=left| Armenia
|3||0||1||2||2||7||-5||1
|}

Group B (Ryazan)
{| class=wikitable style="text-align:center"
|-
!width="165"|Team
!width="20"|
!width="20"|
!width="20"|
!width="20"|
!width="20"|
!width="20"|
!width="20"|
!width="20"|
|- style="background:#cfc"
|align=left| RSFSR
|3||2||1||0||3||1||+2||5
|- 
|align=left| Ukraine
|3||2||0||1||7||2||+5||4
|- 
|align=left| Belorussia
|3||1||1||1||2||4||−2||3
|- 
|align=left| Moldavia
|3||0||0||3||1||6||-5||0
|}

Final playoffs
 7th place playoff (Tula). Moldavian SSR – Armenian SSR 3:2
 5th place playoff (Ryazan). Georgian SSR – Belorussian SSR 2:2, pen. 8:7
 3rd place playoff (Moscow). Moscow – Ukrainian SSR 1:1, pen. 3:1
 1st place playoff (Moscow). Lithuanian SSR – RSFSR 1:0

Teams composition

Moscow
Head coach: Viktor Razumovskiy
Assistant coach: Vladimir Neboronov

Russian SFSR
Head coach: Anzor Kavazashvili
Assistant coach: Nikolai Smirnov

Kyrgyz SSR
Head coach: Nikolai Razumets
Assistant coach: Yusup Musayev

Kazakh SSR
Head coach: Yevgeniy Kuznetsov
Assistant coach: T. Nurmahambetov

Ukrainian SSR
Head coach: Yevhen Kotelnykov
Assistant coach: Vitaliy Khmelnytskyi

Belarusian SSR
Head coach: Gennadiy Abramovich
Assistant coach: Veniamin Arzamastsev

Georgian SSR
Head coach: Vladimir Eloshvili
Assistant coach: Andrey Zazroyev

Further reading
 Football-84: Handbook-calendar / compiled by N.Kiselyov — "Lenizdat", 1984
 "Football-Hockey". № 30, 24 July 1983

References

External links
 1983. Collapse of Ukrainian hopes at the 8th Spartakiad of Peoples of the USSR. Lithuania is the Champion! (1983. Крах украинских надежд на VIII Спартакиаде народов СССР. Литва – чемпион!). tribuna.com. 30 August 2016.
 1983 Season regulations. football.lg.ua
 Teams composition. football.lg.ua
 Belarusian SSR team. www.kick-off.by

1983
Spartakiad of Peoples of the USSR